Cyanoloxia is a genus of grosbeak in the family Cardinalidae.

Species
It contains the following species:

External links
 
 

 
Bird genera
Taxa named by Charles Lucien Bonaparte
Taxonomy articles created by Polbot